Baz Howz-e Olya (also Romanized as Baz Ḩowz̤-e ‘Olyā; also known as Bāz Ḩowz-e Bālā, Bazeh Ḩowz-e Bālā, Bazeh Ḩowz-e ‘Olyā, and Bāz Howz-e Bālā) is a village in Sarjam Rural District, Ahmadabad District, Mashhad County, Razavi Khorasan Province, Iran. At the 2006 census, its population was 297, in 66 families.

References 

Populated places in Mashhad County